The final of the Men's 50 metres Freestyle event at the European LC Championships 1997 was held on Saturday 23 August 1997 in Seville, Spain.

Finals

Qualifying heats

References
 scmsom results
 La Gazzetta Archivio
 swimrankings

F
Men's 50 metre freestyle